Business nationalism is an economic nationalist ideology held by a sector of the political right in the United States.

Business nationalists are conservative business and industrial leaders who favor a protectionist trade policy and an isolationist foreign policy.  Locked in a power struggle with corporate international interests, business nationalists often use populist rhetoric and anti-elitist rhetoric to build a broader base of support in the middle class and working class.

In the past, business nationalism has also been the main sector in the US from which union busting has emerged. There have also been sectors of business nationalism that have promoted the Red Scares, nativism, and allegations of Jewish banking conspiracies.

History

Ultraconservative business and industrial leaders who saw the New Deal implemented in the United States between 1933 and 1936 as proof of an imagined sinister alliance by international finance capital and communist-controlled labor unions to destroy free enterprise became known as "business nationalists".

In the middle of the 1930s Gerald L. K. Smith carried the banner for business nationalists, many of them isolationists who would later oppose the entry of the United States into World War II. Smith received public and financial support from wealthy businessmen who were concentrated in "nationalist-oriented industries". 

These included the heads of national oil companies Quaker State, Pennzoil, and Kendall Refining; automakers Henry Ford, John Francis Dodge, and Horace Elgin Dodge. Business nationalists who networked with other ultra-conservatives included J. Howard Pew, president of Sun Oil, and William B. Bell, president of the chemical company American Cyanamid.

Pew and Bell served on the executive committee of the National Association of Manufacturers. Pew also funded the American Liberty League (1934–1940), Sentinels of the Republic, and other groups that flirted with fascism prior to World War II. After World War II Pew funded conservative Christian evangelicals such as Reverend Billy Graham.

The John Birch Society, founded in 1959, incorporated many themes from pre-World War II right-wing groups opposed to the New Deal and had its base in business nationalist circles. The society heavily disseminated an ultraconservative business nationalist critique of corporate internationalists networked through groups such as the Council on Foreign Relations.

 business nationalism was represented by ultraconservative political figures such as Pat Buchanan.

Criticism

According to progressive scholar Mark Rupert, the right-wing anti-globalist worldview of business nationalists “envisions a world in which Americans are uniquely privileged, inheritors of a divinely inspired socio-political order which must at all costs be defended against external intrusions and internal subversion.”  

Rupert argues that this reactionary analysis seeks to challenge corporate power without comprehending the nature of “capital concentration and the transnational socialization of production.” The reactionary analysis absent this understanding breeds social alienation and intensifies “scapegoating and hostility toward those seen as outside of, different or dissenting from its vision of national identity." As alienation builds, more overtly fascistic forces will attempt to pull some of these angry people into an ideological framework that further justifies the demonization of the chosen "Other."

Investigative reporter Chip Berlet argues:

See also

References

Economic ideologies
Economic nationalism
Nationalism in Australia
Nationalism in the United States
Right-wing populism in the United States